Vice President of the Central African Republic was a political position in the Central African Republic created on two occasions.

References

Politics of the Central African Republic
Government of the Central African Republic
Vice presidents of the Central African Republic
Central Africa